Mälar 22 is a  sailboat class designed by Gustaf Estlander and built in about 150 copies.

History
The Mälar 22 designed by Gustaf Estlander won a design competition hosted by Mälarens Seglarförbund in 1929. The Mälar 22 was a response to the more and more expensive yachts built according to the Skerry cruiser rule.

See also
Mälar 25
Mälar 30

References

1920s sailboat type designs
Sailboat type designs by Finnish designers
Keelboats